Going-to-the-Sun may refer to:

 Going-to-the-Sun Mountain, in Glacier National Park, Montana
 Going-to-the-Sun Road, an east–west highway across Glacier National Park, Montana
 "Going-to-the-Sun Road" (song), by Fleet Foxes